Dr. Syed Abdul Wahab Ashrafi
(2 June 1936 – 15 July 2012) was an Indian literary critic and an eminent personality in the world of Urdu literature. He belonged to the family of the Sufi saint Sultan Syed Makhdoom Ashraf Jahangir Semnani

Early life
Wahab Ashrafi spent his early life in Kako village in Jehanabad district, Bihar.

Awards
 Ashrafi received the Sahitya Akademi Award for his book Tareekh-e-Adab-e-Urdu (Criticism) in 2007.
 Bihar Urdu Academy award
 Bharatiya Bhasha Parishad award

Education
Wahab Ashrafi received Ph.D. (Urdu), MA in Urdu (Gold Medalist), M.A in Persian (Gold Medalist), M.A (English), LLB.

He is an ex-Professor and Head-of-Department of the Dept of Urdu at Ranchi University.
He is also an Ex-Professor in Department of Linguistic at Jawahar Lal Nehru.
University (JNU), New Delhi.

He is ex-chairman, Bihar University Service Commission
and ex-chairman, Bihar Intermediate Council, Patna.
Vice–President of the progressive writer association, World.

Bibliography
Wahab Ashrafi wrote more than three dozen books some of which have been mentioned below
 Tareekh-e-Adabiyat-e-Aalam, 7 volumes
 Tareekh-e-Adab-e-Urdu, 4 volumes
 Falsafa Ishtirakiyat
 Qadeem Adabi Tanqeed
 Mani ki Talash
 Tafhimul Balagat
 Qutub Mushtari ka Tanqeedi Jayeza 
 Mabaad-e-Jadidiyat
 Masnavi aur Masnavyat
 Aalmi Tehrik-e-Nisayat
 Qissa Be-simt Zindagi Ka
 Mera Mutala-e-Quran

Many of his books and works have been translated into other languages.

He was the editor of a Urdu literary magazine Mobahisa.

References

Urdu-language writers from India
Writers from Bihar
1936 births
2012 deaths
20th-century Indian Muslims
Indian literary critics
Recipients of the Sahitya Akademi Award in Urdu
20th-century Indian essayists
Indian male writers